Ellefsen is a surname. Notable people with the surname include:

Gunnar Ellefsen (1930–1997), Norwegian politician for the Labour Party
Håvard Ellefsen (born 1975), Norwegian electronic musician best known as Mortiis
Harald Ellefsen (born 1950), Norwegian politician for the Conservative Party
Henrik Ellefsen (born 1971), Norwegian businessman
Pauli Ellefsen (born 1936), Faroese politician and member of the Union Party

Norwegian-language surnames